Typhoon Emma was a strong typhoon that struck Okinawa during the 1959 Pacific typhoon season. An area of severe weather formed near Kwajalein Atoll on October 30, and the Japan Meteorological Agency (JMA) began tracking it as a tropical depression on November 1. The Joint Typhoon Warning Center followed suit on November 5 after finding a closed circulation, and the depression received the name Emma. The depression strengthened into a tropical storm west of Guam on November 6 and gradually gained strength. Emma became a typhoon on November 11 near Luzon, and it reached its peak sustained winds of  later that day. The typhoon turned northeastwards and grazed Okinawa the next day. Emma steadily weakened and became extratropical on November 13, and the JMA ceased tracking the storm on November 15.

On November 12, Emma caused significant damage in Okinawa, compounding the effects of Typhoon Charlotte in October. Heavy rainfall and strong winds were reported on the islands, flooding the city of Naha and blocking access off to it due to landslides. Shops in the city lost thousands of dollars in merchandise, while crops in the territory were damaged. Minor damage was reported at American military installations, such as Kadena Air Base, where the total damage was worth US$219,586.50. Four people were killed during the storm, and two more were missing. Wind and rain were reported in Guam and the Philippines, and several ships were damaged or sunk by the storm.

Meteorological history

On October 30, 1959, the Joint Typhoon Warning Center (JTWC) began tracking an area of severe weather south of Kwajalein Atoll. Two days later, the Japan Meteorological Agency (JMA) designated the area as a tropical depression. The area was designated as a tropical depression at 06:00 UTC on November 5 by the JTWC, receiving the name Emma. The storm gradually increased in strength, with its eye ill-defined for a majority of the time.

The JMA reported Emma's lowest surface pressure, at 00:00 UTC on November 12 east of Formosa. After reaching its peak, westerlies had begun to influence Emma, and the typhoon began to turn northeast and accelerate. The typhoon continued to increase in speed, and it lost strength throughout November 13. The JTWC ceased tracking the cyclone at 00:00 UTC on November 15, and the JMA stopped 12 hours later, where it was located west of Midway Atoll.

Preparations and impact
The depression bought  of rain to the island. In the Philippines, typhoon signal #3 was issued for northern Luzon, and the storm delayed President Carlos P. Garcia's departure from Tagbilaran via ship late on November 12. The ship, RPS Lapu-Lapu, received high winds and waves throughout the day. No damage was reported in Taiwan as the storm turned away.

At sea, several Japanese tankers were damaged by the storm. The tanker had sprung a leak, and 35 of the 38 members of its crew were rescued by Ryuho Maru, which arrived at Naha on November 15. One member of the Nikkai Maru crew drowned, and two were reported as missing. Another tanker, Yoneyama Maru, had its rudder damaged by driftwood near Ishigaki, causing it to drift. The tanker was rescued by a United States Navy ship. In total, officials reported eight vessels were sunk and eight more were missing, with others reporting 47 vessels that were damaged or sunk. Itoman City Disaster Prevention Council recorded 13 vessels sunk in the city's disaster plan in 2006.

Several preparations were made before Emma struck Okinawa. American servicemen across the territory received warnings and emergency food and water, while remaining in their homes. American military aircraft stationed in the area were evacuated to other areas in East Asia. Nike Hercules missile testing was cancelled for November 14–16 and was rescheduled for the week after. Construction of bleachers for the event was also disrupted. Due to concerns after the landslides caused by Typhoon Charlotte one month earlier, 2,400 residents were evacuated from dangerous areas. There were concerns about food shortages for January 1960, as Charlotte destroyed much of the crops earlier that year.

Emma passed Okinawa to the south by  late on November 12. Landslides blocked off roads leading to Naha and many trees were uprooted. Power lines were downed and communications were disrupted, preventing an early assessment of damage. The storm caused severe flooding in downtown Naha, with low-lying areas submerged under  of water, forcing residents to move to higher ground. Many shops in the area were damaged by the debris in the flooding, destroying thousands of dollars of merchandise. Crops, which were already damaged by Charlotte, were damaged again by heavy winds and rains. On Amami Ōshima, one-fourth of Nago was flooded by heavy rains. In Ōgimi, nine houses were completely or partially destroyed, and 110 houses were flooded or partially flooded. American military installations in the territory were slightly damaged, with several Marine units reporting flooding and damaged buildings and supplies. The damage at Kadena Air Base amounted to $219,586.50. At least two people were killed in Okinawa and one fisherman away from the islands during the storm. There were no fatalities or injuries within the number of American servicemen and their dependents. One fisherman previously listed as missing and presumed dead on November 13, Kentoku Kayoda, was found washed ashore after ten days at sea. He survived on rainwater and raw fish, and when he returned home he was able to join a meal of rice cakes which his wife had prepared for his funeral.

Cleanup began soon after Emma passed Okinawa, and electricity was restored to the islands late on November 13. Telephone service returned on the next day. Repairs for roads, culverts, and drainage ditches began in February 1960, using $100,000 of funding requested after the storm hit Okinawa.

See also
 Other storms of the same name

Notes

References

External links

 

1959 in Japan
1959 Pacific typhoon season
Typhoons in Japan